After the fall of Norway to Nazi Germany on 10 June 1940, the Norwegian whale factory ship Suderøy and her whale catchers, Suderøy IV (J03), Suderøy V (J04), Suderøy VI (J05) and Star XVI were ordered to sail to Halifax from Hampton Roads, where they had taken refuge. In June 1940, at Halifax, Suderøy IV, V and VI were chartered from the Norwegian government in exile by the Royal Canadian Navy, converted and commissioned as minesweepers.

Ships
 Suderøy IV was launched at Oslo, Norway, in 1930. Served with the Halifax Local Defence Force from June 1941 until paid off in August 1945, and returned to her former owners. Condemned and sunk October 1987.
 Suderøy V was launched at Oslo, Norway, in 1930. Served with both the St. John's Local Defence Force and the Halifax Local Defence Force from June 1941 until paid off in August 1945, and returned to her former owners. In use as of 2001.
 Suderøy VI was built in Middlesbrough, UK, and launched in 1929 as Southern Gem. Served with the Halifax Local Defence Force from March 1941 until paid off in August 1945, and returned to her former owners to resume her occupation as whale catcher. Sunk January 1983.

References
 Macpherson, Ken and John Burgess, The Ships of Canada's Naval Forces 1910–1985. Collins Publishers: 
 Norwegian Merchant Fleet 1939–1945

World War II minesweepers of Canada
1929 ships
Auxiliary ships of the Royal Canadian Navy